Alfredo Sánchez (28 May 1904 - unknown) was a Mexican football forward who made three appearances for Mexico at the 1930 FIFA World Cup.

Honours
International
Central American and Caribbean Games Gold Medal: 1938

References

External links

1904 births
2000 deaths
Mexico international footballers
1930 FIFA World Cup players
Footballers from Veracruz
Mexican footballers
Central American and Caribbean Games gold medalists for Mexico
Competitors at the 1938 Central American and Caribbean Games
Association football midfielders
Club América footballers
Central American and Caribbean Games medalists in football
20th-century Mexican people